Steve Trimble (born December 21, 1942) is an American politician in the state of Minnesota. He served in the Minnesota House of Representatives.

References

Democratic Party members of the Minnesota House of Representatives
1942 births
Living people